Postal voting in the United States, also referred to as mail-in voting or vote by mail, is a form of absentee ballot in the United States, in which a ballot is mailed to the home of a registered voter, who fills it out and returns it by postal mail or drops it off in-person at a secure drop box or voting center. Postal voting reduces staff requirements at polling centers during an election. All-mail elections can save money, while a mix of voting options can cost more. In some states, ballots may be sent by the Postal Service without prepayment of postage.

Research shows that the availability of postal voting increases voter turnout. It has been argued that postal voting has a greater risk of fraud than in-person voting, though known instances of such fraud are very rare, with one database finding absentee-ballot fraud to be the most prevalent type of election fraud, comprising about 24% of 491 reported prosecutions between 2000 and 2012. Processing large numbers of ballots and signature verifications accurately has numerous challenges other than fraud.

As of 2022, eight statesCalifornia, Colorado, Hawaii, Nevada, Oregon, Utah, and Washingtonhold elections almost entirely by mail, with general elections also held via mail in Vermont. Postal voting is an option in 33 states and the District of Columbia. Other states allow postal voting only in certain circumstances, though the COVID-19 pandemic in 2020 has prompted further discussion about relaxing some of those restrictions. In the run up to the 2020 United States presidential election, after repeatedly asserting that mail-in voting would result in widespread fraud, President Donald Trump indicated he would block necessary funding for the postal service to ensure that postal votes would be processed securely and on time. In September 2020, CNN obtained a Homeland Security Department intelligence bulletin asserting "Russia is likely to continue amplifying criticisms of vote-by-mail and shifting voting processes amidst the COVID-19 pandemic to undermine public trust in the electoral process." Motivated by false claims of widespread voter fraud in the 2020 election, Republican lawmakers initiated a push to roll back access to postal voting.

History
Absentee ballots were first used for the military during the American Civil War. Early absentee voting laws restricted the practice to members of the armed services. The first allowance for civilian absentee voting was in Vermont in 1896. By 1938, 42 states allowed absentee voting for civilians. Nearly 2% of voters in the 1936 election voted through absentee ballots. The share of absentee voters has increased over time. Historically, one particularly prominent group who voted through absentee ballots were federal employees in Washington, D.C.

Process

After the introduction of absentee voting, postal votes were for people who could not go to the polling place on election day. Now some states let them be used for convenience, but state laws still call them absentee ballots. Some states let voters with permanent disabilities apply for permanent absentee voter status, and some other states let all citizens apply for permanent status, so they will automatically receive an absentee ballot for each election. Otherwise a voter must apply for an absentee ballot before each election.

Ballots or applications for postal ballots are sent out before the election date, by a margin that depends on state law. In some states, a voter's pamphlet is also distributed. The election office prints a unique barcode on the return envelope provided for each ballot, so processing of each envelope can be tracked, sometimes publicly, and corresponding signature files can be loaded quickly to check the voter's signature on the envelope when it returns.
Voters who lose the return envelope can still vote by obtaining another envelope from election officials, or in some jurisdictions by using a plain envelope.

To vote by mail, an individual marks the ballot for their choice of the candidates (or writes in their name), places it in the provided mailing envelope, seals it and signs and dates the back of the mailing envelope. Some jurisdictions use one envelope or privacy sleeve inside an outer envelope, for privacy. The envelope containing the ballot is then either mailed, or dropped off at a local ballot collection center.

The deadline is determined by state law. In some jurisdictions, postmarks are not counted, and ballots must be received by a certain time on election day. In other jurisdictions, a ballot must have a postmark on or before the day of the election and be received prior to the date of certification. Many vote-by-mail jurisdictions enlist the help of volunteers to take ballots in walk-up drop off booths or drive-up quick drop locations. The Help America Vote Act requires some polling options, often at central election headquarters, with voting machines designed for disabled people.

It is sometimes inaccurately claimed that absentee ballots are not counted unless the race is close; in fact, in most jurisdictions, all valid absentee ballots are counted even if they will not affect the outcome of an election.

In the 2016 US Presidential election, approximately 33 million ballots were cast by postal vote, about a quarter of all ballots cast. Some jurisdictions used only vote-by-mail and others absentee votes.

In April 2020, during lockdowns for the coronavirus pandemic, an NBC News/Wall Street Journal poll found that 58% of American voters would favor nationwide election reform to allow everyone to vote by mail, and another 9% (total 67%) favor allowing it this year because of COVID-19. Pew Research found at the same time that 49% of Republicans supported this measure and 87% of Democrats did.

Voting from abroad (UOCAVA)

In 2018, 350,000 ballots came through procedures of the Uniformed and Overseas Citizens Absentee Voting Act (UOCAVA), from military and merchant marine voters stationed inside or outside the United States, and other citizens living outside the United States. In 1986 Congress enacted UOCAVA, which requires that the states and territories allow United States citizens residing outside the United States, as well as members of the United States Uniformed Services and merchant marine, and their family members, inside or outside the United States, to register at their last residence in the US, and vote absentee in elections for federal offices. Most states and territories also let these citizens vote in state and local elections, and most states let citizens who have never lived in the US vote at their parents' last address.

Though many states had pre-existing statutes in place, UOCAVA made it mandatory and nationally uniform. Voters eligible for UOCAVA who do not receive an absentee ballot from their state in time to vote, may use the Federal Write-In Absentee Ballot. The voter's signature goes on an information sheet enclosed with this ballot, not on the envelope. It requires following state requirements for witnesses, but not for notaries. Almost half the states require ballots to be returned by mail. Other states allow mail along with some combination of fax, or email; four states allow a web portal. West Virginia experimented with use of smart phones, but this is no longer available.

In states
The National Conference of State Legislatures has many tables showing rules about postal voting in every state.

Texas (voting from orbit)
In 1996, astronaut John Blaha was not able to vote in the November 1996 election, because his mission on Mir began before ballots were finalized, and lasted beyond Election Day. As a result, in 1997, Texas amended its election statutes to permit voting from outer space. The process extends traditional postal voting: the ballot is postal-mailed to a designated mailbox maintained by NASA, which sends it by encrypted electronic mail to the astronaut. After the astronaut completes the ballot, it is sent to the applicable Texas county clerk, who transcribes it to a paper ballot. The clerk is the only individual other than the voter who knows the contents of the submitted ballot. The first person to vote from space was astronaut David Wolf, who in 1997 voted in a local Texas election under the new law.

All vote-by-mail
As of 2022, Colorado, Hawaii, Oregon, Nevada, Utah, and Washington State conduct their elections entirely by mail, while Vermont holds general elections entirely by mail. In many other states there are counties or certain small elections where everyone votes by mail.
California mailed every voter a ballot before the November 2020 election; California voters still kept the option to vote in-person.

California
In 2016, California passed SB 450, which authorizes a roll-out of vote by mail across the state, at county discretion. The state publishes postal voting rates, rising from 3% in 1962 to 72% in 2020. For the 2018 elections, 14 counties were authorized to vote by mail and five ultimately did so: Madera, Napa, Nevada, Sacramento, and San Mateo. In each of those five counties, voter turnout was higher than the average turnout for the state. For 2020, all counties will be authorized to do so, and as of April 8, 2020 the following ten additional counties have opted in: Amador, Butte, Calaveras, El Dorado, Fresno, Los Angeles, Mariposa, Orange, Santa Clara, and Tuolumne.

As of 2022, California mails every registered voter a ballot before the elections, but there is still the option to vote in-person.

Colorado
In 2013, Colorado began holding all elections by mail. A Pantheon Analytics study of the 2014 election showed a significant uptick in voter participation from what would have normally been "low propensity" voters. A PEW Charitable Trust study of the same election showed significant cost savings.

Hawaii
Hawaii instituted All-Vote-by-Mail for all elections beginning with its primary in May 2020.

Kansas
Kansas conducted its Democratic primary in May 2020 entirely by mail.

Nevada
Nevada Governor Steve Sisolak (D) signed legislation authorizing mail-in-voting for every registered voter in the state on August 3, 2020. (Donald Trump threatened to sue, although Trump endorsed mail-in-voting in Republican-controlled Florida.) That law was only temporary, applying only to the 2020 election. On June 2, 2021, Governor Sisolak signed a law making all vote-by-mail permanent, although voters can opt out of getting ballots by mail.

New Jersey
New Jersey conducted a primarily vote by mail election for the primary in July 2020 albeit with a limited number of polling stations open for those who would vote provisionally as well as voters with disabilities.

Oregon

In 1998, voters in Oregon passed an initiative requiring that all elections be conducted by mail. Voters may also drop their ballots off at a county designated official drop site. Oregon has since reduced the cost of elections, and the time available to tally votes has increased. Initially, Oregon required receipt of votes by 8:00pm local time on election day. But starting with the general election in 2020, ballots needed to be postmarked by Election Day. Also starting then, pre-paid postage envelopes were included with the ballots. Voter turnout in Oregon is among the highest in the United States.

Utah
In 2014, Utah started allowing each county to make their own decision regarding whether to go to all mailed-out ballots. In the 2016 general election, 21 of 29 counties did so. That rose to 27 of 29 counties in 2018, covering over 98% of their electorate, with all counties doing so in 2020. A Pantheon Analytics study of Utah's 2016 general election showed a 5–7% point higher turnout in the counties using vote by mail than those with traditional polling places, with even higher differences (~10% points) among younger voters.

Vermont
On May 18, 2021, the Vermont legislature passed a bill requiring general elections to be all vote-by-mail. Vermont Governor Phil Scott signed that bill on June 7, 2021, and asked the legislature to expand all vote-by-mail to primary elections too.

Washington
In 2011, the Washington legislature passed a law requiring all counties to conduct vote-by-mail elections. Local governments in Washington had the option to do so since 1987, and statewide elections had permitted it since 1993. By 2009, 38 of the state's 39 counties (all except Pierce County) had conducted all elections by mail. Pierce County joined the rest of the state in all-mail balloting by 2014. In Washington, ballots must be postmarked by election day, which helps to ensure all voters' votes are counted; ballot counting takes several days after election day to receive and process ballots. Beginning in 2018 postage is prepaid so voters do not have to use a stamp.

Local jurisdictions
Various local jurisdictions now have all vote-by-mail, or run pilot programs. 31 of 53 counties in North Dakota now vote by mail, as do over 1000 precincts in Minnesota (those with fewer than 400 registered voters). In 2018, pilot programs in Anchorage, Alaska exceeded previous turnout records and Garden County, Nebraska saw higher turnout versus the state average. Rockville, Maryland piloted vote-by-mail in 2019. In 2018, Connecticut's Governor issued Executive Order 64, directing a study of a possible move to vote by mail.

No-excuse Vote-by-Mail
Florida allows postal voting for any reason.

In 2018, Michigan passed Proposal 3, a state constitutional amendment legalizing "no-excuse" voting by mail (meaning that the voter does not need to provide a reason for requesting a mail-in ballot) and other election reforms. In 2020 three more states joined the majority of states which already allowed "no excuse" voting by mail: Pennsylvania, Rhode Island, and Virginia. Other states have relaxed restrictions on mail in ballots for a total of 46 states to allow voting by mail due to COVID-19.

On May 31, 2021, the Illinois legislature passed a bill that expanded curbside voting and establishes a permanent vote-by-mail system, and it creates a permanent voter list. It was signed by Illinois Governor JB Pritzker on June 18, 2021.

Timeline of adoption of no-excuse postal voting

Turnout

Insofar as postal voting makes the act of voting easier, it may facilitate a campaign's get out the vote efforts. Campaigns can also target potential voters more efficiently by skipping those whose ballots have already been processed by the elections office. Conversely, face-to-face canvassing has been found to be less effective with postal voting.

In 2016, the US Government Accountability Office (GAO) issued a report outlining turnout improvements seen in vote by mail elections.

Researchers in 2020 have found that in elections with all-mail voting, overall turnout increases. This increase is particularly pronounced among groups that typically have low turnout rates, such as young people and people of color. For instance, in Colorado they found overall turnout rose 9 percentage points, while it rose 16 percentage points among young people, 13 among African-Americans, 11 among Asian-Americans, 10 among Latinos, blue-collar workers, those without a high school diploma, and those with less than $10,000 of wealth.

Reliability of postal ballots

Rejection statistics

In 2016, a presidential election year, a total of 318,728 ballots (1% of those submitted) were rejected. For the states that reported a reason, some of the reasons were:
 27.5% Non-matching signature
 23.1% Ballot missed deadline
 20.0% No signature
 3.0% No witness signature
 1.5% Voter deceased
 1.3% Voted in person
 1.1% First-time voter without proper identification

By August 2020, after the next presidential primary season but before the general election, more than 550,000 had already been rejected.

Past problems
Postal ballots have been the source of "most significant vote-counting disputes in recent decades" according to Edward Foley, director of the Election Law program at Ohio State University.
Among the thousands of elections from 2000 to 2012, there were 491 known cases of absentee ballot fraud,
and the Heritage Foundation lists additional cases since 2012.

Richard Hasen, a professor at UC Irvine School of Law said "problems are extremely rare in the five states that rely primarily on vote-by-mail."
Justin Levitt, a law professor at Loyola Marymount University does not have statistics on postal ballot fraud, but said "I do collect anecdotal reports... misconduct in the mail voting process is meaningfully more prevalent than misconduct in the process of voting in person... Misconduct still amounts to only a tiny fraction of the ballots cast by mail."
Lonna Atkeson, an expert in election administration, said about mail-in voting fraud, "It's really hard to find... The fact is, we really don't know how much fraud there is... There aren't millions of fraudulent votes, but there are some."

In 2018, a report from the US Senate Intelligence Committee of Russian meddling in the 2016 election pointed out that auditable paper ballots, by definition part of all vote by mail elections, were potentially safer than paperless voting systems,
which are still used in a few states. However, only about half the states actually use paper ballots to conduct election audits.

Specific types of problems include:
 Voter's request for postal ballot is lost or not received or processed in time, in states that require one, thus the voter must vote in person or not vote (for example over 9,000 properly requested ballots were not sent in Wisconsin in 2020)
 Voter's request for postal ballot is altered or forged
 In states that mail ballots to registered voters without request, some voters have died or moved, and any ballots not returned by the post office can get into the wrong hands
 Election office sends voters the wrong instructions or a ballot with someone else's name on it, or wrong ballot, when offices on the ballot differ by party or district.
 Voter does not receive mailed ballot, because it does not arrive at the address in time, or someone else takes it
 Voter misplaces ballot, so must vote with provisional ballot, and someone else may find and vote the original postal ballot, leading to rejection of the provisional ballot.
 Voter is pressured to vote a certain way by family, caregiver, or other, or provide the blank ballot to someone
 Voters may be paid to vote a certain way
 Someone collects many ballots and does not deliver the ones from neighborhoods likely to vote against the collector's candidates
 Someone collects many ballots, opens envelopes, and marks votes; if voter has already voted, fraudster can mark extra votes on same contests, to invalidate ballot
 Mail can be stolen from postal service
 Staff can leave key in drop box.
 Envelope printer prints erroneous tracking code on return envelope, so it may be processed inaccurately or rejected.
 Voter's signature on envelope is missing (55,000 in 2018) or does not match signature on file (67,000), so either there is widespread fraud being prevented by signature reviews, or if these submissions were not fraudulent, then valid ballots are being rejected
 Forged signature on envelope is accepted as close enough to signature on file, so invalid ballots are accepted
 Signature rejection rates vary by race, county and state, ranging from none to 20% rejected
 Election office receives the ballot late (114,000 ballots in 2018); in a Philadelphia experiment, most ballots were misplaced by the postal service, and even after they were found, 21% took more than 4 days to arrive and 3% took more than a week
 Staff who open envelopes falsify or ignore ballots
 Compilation of votes omits postal ballots

These problems with postal ballots can be categorized as (A) procedural issues, which may not have solutions; (B) collection of ballots by dishonest collectors, which is partly controlled in many states by limits on the number of ballots that one person can deliver, though collectors can still mail in the ballots they collect,
and the 9th Circuit Court of Appeals disallowed Arizona's limits based on discriminatory intent;
(C) signature verification, which has inherent errors and may have bias, and (D) insider issues, which are partly addressed by enough staffing, quality control, and openness to observation by the public or candidates.

Some problems have inherently limited scope, such as family pressure and bribes, while others can affect several percent of the vote, such as signature verification.

Security printing

Some states say they print postal ballots on special paper to prevent forgeries.
California assigns a tinted watermark to the ballots for each election, which is created by printing an image with a screen rather than density variations.
Special papers, microprinting, magnetic ink and other measures are common to protect currency, bank checks and stamps. Election officials do not say that envelopes have these features, nor that they review ballots based on these methods, though the Labor Department reviews paper when considering if union election ballots are forged.

The largest US vendor of election scanners required use of its own paper as of 2015, and "highly recommended" it as of 2019. The paper has specified weight, thickness, reflectivity for compatibility with scanners, but the scanner does not measure these to detect forgeries. The company says colored paper may not be used. Colors may be printed in areas away from the voting marks, but they are scanned as either black or white, no gray.

States print bar codes on return envelopes to identify the voter (coding a serial number for each envelope mailed), so a forger would need to access the coding system in order to forge bar codes. California lets voters write votes "in a letter or note" on any paper, and enclose as many such notes in a vote by mail envelope as will fit, with a signature for each on the outside. Only one bar code on the envelope is needed.

Ballot printing is centralized. For example, California has nine authorized ballot printers.
Maryland uses one ballot printer state-wide.
One company, Runbeck, printed 36 million ballots for 214 counties in 11 states for the November 2020 election, of which about half were postal ballots.
Runbeck did not use watermarks or tracking marks in the paper, at least in Maricopa County which has over 60% of Arizona's voters.
Another company serves many counties in Ohio and Pennsylvania.

Signature verification process

Most States check signatures to attempt to prevent forged paper ballots. Signature mismatches were the most common reason for rejecting postal ballots in 2016 and the second most common, after late arrival, in 2018. While many states accept in-person votes without needing identification, most require some verification on postal ballots. Eighteen states simply require a signature on the ballot envelope, without verifying the signature, The other 32 states verify if the signature matches one on file, and some of these states require witnesses or notaries.

The first step after receiving mailed ballots is to compare the voter's signature on the outside of the envelope with one or more signatures on file in the election office. Smaller jurisdictions have temporary staff compare signatures. Larger jurisdictions use computers to scan envelopes, quickly decide if the signature matches well enough, and set aside non-matches in a separate bin. Temporary staff then double-check the rejections, and in some places check the accepted envelopes too.

Error rates of computerized signature reviews are not published. The best academic researchers have 10-14% error rates. Algorithms:look for a certain number of points of similarity between the compared signatures... a wide range of algorithms and standards, each particular to that machine's manufacturer, are used to verify signatures. In addition, counties have discretion in managing the settings and implementing manufacturers' guidelines... there are no statewide standards for automatic signature verification... most counties do not have a publicly available, written explanation of the signature verification criteria and processes they use.

Handwriting experts say "it is extremely difficult for anyone to be able to figure out if a signature or other very limited writing sample has been forged," In manual signature reviews, "election officials with little or no training in verifying a person's signature are tasked with doing just that... it's unlikely that only one or two samples will show the spectrum of a person's normal variations..."
Colorado's guide for manual verification is recommended by the federal government. Colorado accepts any signature that matches with respect to cursive v. printed, flowing v. slow and deliberate, overall spacing, size, proportions, slanted v. straight, spelling and punctuation. When signatures do not match on these items, staff still accept them if staff can think of a reasonable explanation for differences.
In a California study, most counties, when they manually reviewed ballot signatures, had "a basic presumption in favor of counting each ballot." California extended this standard in 2020 regulations, "begin with the basic presumption that the signature on the petition or ballot envelope is the voter's signature... only be rejected if two different elections officials unanimously find beyond a reasonable doubt that the signature differs in multiple, significant, and obvious respects from all signatures in the voter's registration record."
Texas officials must use their "best judgment" without training.
Published examples show very different signatures coming from the same person.

In 16 states, when election offices reject signatures, they notify the voters so they can mail another signature, which may be just as hard to check, or they can come to the office and vouch for the envelope, usually in less than a week; the other 36 states have no process to cure discrepancies.
Notification by US mail results in more cures than email or telephone notice.
In the Florida 2020 general election, 73% of the 47,000 initially rejected ballots were cured, and in the 2022 Vermont primary, 61% of 809 were cured.

Rejected envelopes, with ballots still unseen in them, are stored in case of future challenges. Accepted envelopes are opened and separated from the envelopes in a way that no one sees the external name and the ballot choices. The Election Assistance Commission says machines can help, but this step requires the most space of any step, especially when workers have to be 6 feet apart.

Unequal signature rejection rates

The highest error rates in signature verification are found with lay people, higher than for computers, which in turn make more errors than experts.
Researchers have published error rates for computerized signature verification. They compare different systems on a common database of true and false signatures. The best system falsely rejects 10% of true signatures, while it accepts 10% of forgeries. Another system has error rates on both of 14%, and the third-best has error rates of 17%.
It is possible to be less stringent and reject fewer true signatures, at the cost of also rejecting fewer forgeries, which means erroneously accepting more forgeries.
Vendors of automated signature verification claim accuracy, and do not publish their error rates.

Voters with short names are at a disadvantage, since even experts make more mistakes on signatures with fewer "turning points and intersections."

The National Vote at Home Institute reports that 17 states do not mandate a signature verification process.

In the November 2016 general election, rejections ranged from none in Alabama and Puerto Rico, to 6% of ballots returned in Arkansas, Georgia, Kentucky and New York.
In 2020 special elections in New Jersey, 10% of postal ballots were rejected, much higher than the 3% rejections in the 2018 general election in New Jersey. The rise was largely attributed to inexperience of many voters using postal ballots for the first time, though some elections have resulted in charges regarding voter fraud. One such race was the Paterson municipal election, where 19% of ballots cast were disqualified. Approximately 800 of the more than 3190 votes disqualified were related to the various voter fraud allegations.
Where reasons for rejection were known, in 2018, 114,000 ballots arrived late, 67,000 failed signature verification, 55,000 lacked voter signatures, and 11,000 lacked witness signatures in states that require them.

Rejection rates are higher for ballots that claim to come from young or minority voters. In the 2020 primary and 2016 general elections, Florida officials rejected 4% of postal ballots that claimed to come from voters aged 18–25. In the 2018 general election they rejected 5%. In Florida over age 60 or 65, rejections were only one percent in 2020, two thirds of a percent in 2018 and half a percent in 2016. However over age 90, rejection rates were above average, though not as high as under age 25. Rejections were 2% for ballots claiming to come from Florida non-white voters, and 1% from white voters in all three years.
In the 2018 Florida election, 4% of postal ballots from military voters stationed inside the United States were rejected.
Florida voters are not allowed to cure signature problems if these are discovered after election day.

Florida rejection rates in 2016 varied by county, ranging from none to 4%, and up to 5% for ballots that claimed to come from blacks or Hispanics in some counties. Two counties with large universities rejected 9% of 18-21-year-olds: Alachua and Orange, while Pinellas, which also has large universities, rejected 0.2% of this age range.

In Georgia's 2018 general election, most counties rejected higher fractions of ballots claiming to come from black or Hispanic voters than from white voters. The highest rejection rates for ballots that claimed to come from black voters were in Polk 17%, Taylor and Clay 16%, Putnam, and Warren 14%, Atkinson and Candler 13%, McIntosh 12%, and Glynn 10%. For Hispanics, Thomas and Putnam counties rejected 20%, Bulloch 14%, Barlow 12%, Glynn 11%, Decatur 10%. The highest rates for whites were Pickens 13%, Coffee and Polk 10%. Researchers also found higher rejection rates for women, which they hypothesized could relate to name changes not updated at the voter registration office,
though issues with hyphenated last names can also cause signature rejections.
Bias in computer verification depends on the set of signatures used for training the computer, and bias in manual review depends on whether the temporary staff recognize names as non-white.

Many voter registrations, especially for younger voters, come from driver's license applications, where the signature was done on an electronic signature pad. People move their hands differently when signing on paper and on electronic pads. Further the pads used have low resolution, so distinctive elements of paper signatures on the ballot envelopes, are blurred or omitted in the electronic signatures used for comparison. Signatures also have more variation, and therefore are harder to verify, when they come from people who rarely use Roman characters, such as some Asian-Americans. Election officials find that a decline in cursive writing leads to young voters more often printing their names in signature blocks; a California official said she "cannot compare a printed name to a signature."

This is a difficult process for the actual workers that reject signatures.  Attorney Raul Macias said "Staff are under-trained, they're under-resourced, and they'll be under tremendous pressure to get results quickly and they're moving through thousands or millions of signatures."  While 22 states allow the "curing" of a ballot signature, 28 do not.

Recommendations for signature verification

The Election Assistance Commission says computers should be set to accept only nearly perfect signature matches, and humans should doublecheck a sample, but they do not discuss acceptable error rates or sample sizes.

The Election Assistance Commission says the first human check of a signature rejected by machines will average 30 seconds, and a sample of decisions to accept should be checked. They recommend all rejections should be checked by bipartisan teams (6 feet apart) who will average 3 minutes for the final decision to reject, which means 6 minutes of staff time, plus supervision time. The commission also discusses the challenges of moving large numbers of envelopes without mixups from receipt, to machines, and various steps of verification, rejection, and voter notification to cure mismatches, as well as counting and logging the number of ballots at every step. They mention the extra security needed when voters send copies of identity documents to cure their signature rejection.

The Election Assistance Commission notes that signatures over ten years old are another problem and recommends Hawaii's practice of inviting every voter to send a new signature. California researchers recommended that the public needs easy access to see the signature on file before mailing in ballots, to further maximize matches.

The National Vote at Home Institute recommends state-wide or regional centers for signature verification to increase transparency. and reduce the insider risks of temporary local staff,
though the Election Assistance Commission notes that shared equipment may not be consistent with local chain of custody requirements, and that public bidding may take months.

Blue shift

Blue shift is an observed phenomenon under which in-person votes overstate the true final percent of votes for the Republican Party (whose color is red), while provisional (and mail-in) votes, which are counted later, overstate the true final percent of votes for the Democratic Party (whose color is blue). This means election day results can initially show a large Republican lead, or "red mirage", but mail-in ballots later demonstrate a Democratic victory. This can also happen in the opposite direction, when there is a "blue mirage", or early lead by Democrats, followed by a red shift back to Republicans. This can lead observers to call into question the election legitimacy, when in fact, the election results are legitimate. Blue shift occurs because young voters, low-income voters, and voters who move often, are likely to vote by mail and are likely to lean Democratic.

The phenomenon was first identified by Edward Foley of Ohio State University in 2013. He found that Democratic candidates are significantly more likely to gain votes during the canvass period, which are the votes counted after election night. This asymmetry did not always exist, as in the 20th century, as recently as the 1996 United States presidential election, Republicans and Democrats were both able to cut their opponents' lead during the canvass period. Foley conjectured that the 2002 passage of the Help America Vote Act accelerated the pronounced asymmetry of the blue shift phenomenon, because it required states to allow provisional ballots to be cast. He later found that the variation in the size of the blue shift is positively associated with the number of provisional ballots and the Democratic partisanship of the state in question. The growth in the persistent blue-shifted overtime vote began with the 2004 United States presidential election.

Other challenges

In the case of all-postal voting, or a high proportion of postal votes, there cannot be traditional "Election Night" news coverage in which the results are delivered within hours after polls close, as it takes several days to deliver and count ballots. As a result, it may require several days beyond the mail-in deadline before results can be publicized.

Postal voting depends on the viability of the postal service. As of early 2020, the U.S. Postal Service has "a negative net worth of $65 billion and an additional $140 billion in unfunded liabilities." This financial crisis has become more pressing amidst the coronavirus pandemic, as the $2 trillion economic stimulus package did not include money for the postal service.

Alternatives
An increasing number of states in the US now allow drive-thru voting. In the process voters leave their absentee ballots in a drop box at designated locations. Some locations allow drop-off voting 24/7.

Many states provide voters with multiple ways to return their ballot: by mail, via in person secure drop boxes, and at voting centers where they can get questions answered, replacement ballots, etc. Oregon now has 300 drop boxes across the state in the weeks leading up to each election, and more voters now cast their ballot in person than by return mail. The term "vote at home" is starting to replace "vote by mail" for that reason. California's roll-out of vote-by-mail is incorporating voting centers as a key part of their effort. Anchorage's successful pilot included many drop boxes and some voting centers.

Expansion in 2020 election

In 2020, amid the COVID-19 pandemic, a significant increase in postal ballots was expected. The National Vote at Home Institute, which advocates postal ballots and is led by former Denver elections director Amber McReynolds, analyzed all states and found that 32 states "are missing major pieces of policy or best practices that ensure a secure mail ballot process" including 15 states which lack steps to verify voters' addresses, 17 which do not mandate a signature verification process, and 30 do not have adequate options to cure defects in voter signatures. In many systems voters have no way to remedy disqualifications due to signature mismatches.

While members of Congress pushed to expand absentee voting and the CDC and other public health experts advised postal voting as a form of voting which minimizes in-person contact, President Donald Trump claimed that expansion of absentee voting would lead to "levels of voting that, if you ever agreed to it, you'd never have a Republican elected in this country again." In May 2020, Trump began to claim that postal voting was highly vulnerable to fraud. Fact checkers say there is no evidence of substantial fraud associated with mail voting. In July 2020, Trump suggested postponing the 2020 presidential election based on his unsubstantiated claims about extensive postal voting fraud. The new, Trump-appointed administration of the United States Postal Service made changes which resulted in slower delivery of mail. Donald Trump openly stated that he opposes funding USPS because of mail-in voting. In September 2020, a federal judge issued an injunction against the recent USPS actions, ruling that Trump and DeJoy were "involved in a politically motivated attack on the efficiency of the Postal Service", adding that the 14 states requesting the injunction "demonstrated that this attack on the Postal Service is likely to irreparably harm the states' ability to administer the 2020 general election".

The USPS warned that it could not guarantee that all ballots cast by mail in the 2020 election would arrive in time to be counted. For this reason, election experts advocated that postal ballots be mailed weeks in advance of election day.

In several court cases, Republicans in national and state legislatures have pushed to restrict access or place more stringent limitations upon postal voting while Democrats have pushed to expand it or lift restrictions.

See also
 Early voting
 Elections in the United States
 Electronic voting in the United States
 Voter suppression

References

Further reading

External links
 Vote By Mail – Absentee Voting Information from Rock the Vote
 Everything you need to know to vote Tool to request absentee ballots, and explanations, from Vote.org
 Comparisons of states from National Conference of State Legislatures
 Changes du to Covid-19 from Ballotpedia
 State data from Election Assistance Commission

Elections in the United States
Voting in the United States
Articles containing video clips